Parker High School is a high school in Parker, Arizona. It is the only high school in the Parker Unified School District, which also includes one junior high, two elementary schools, and a primary school. 

It was formerly known as Northern Yuma County Union High School. 

Parker High School's volleyball team won the 3A state championship in 2007.

References

Public high schools in Arizona
Schools in La Paz County, Arizona